Kenan Özer (born 16 August 1987) is a Turkish footballer who plays for Bodrumspor.

Career
He previously played as a striker in Turkey for the Istanbul sports club, Beşiktaş J.K. and  Çaykur Rizespor in the TFF First League.

A native of Nicosia, the capital of Cyprus, Kenan Özer was born in the part of the city, known by its Turkish name, Lefkoşa, which also serves as the capital of the internationally unrecognized Turkish Republic of Northern Cyprus.  While playing, he wore 80 as the unusual number on his shirt.

References

External links
 
 

1987 births
Turkish Cypriot expatriate sportspeople in Turkey
Living people
Sportspeople from North Nicosia
Turkish footballers
Turkey under-21 international footballers
Turkey youth international footballers
Turkish Cypriot footballers
Turkish people of Cypriot descent
Beşiktaş J.K. footballers
Çaykur Rizespor footballers
İstanbulspor footballers
Kayseri Erciyesspor footballers
Antalyaspor footballers
Boluspor footballers
Akhisarspor footballers
Konyaspor footballers
Adana Demirspor footballers
MKE Ankaragücü footballers
Gaziantep F.K. footballers
Yeni Malatyaspor footballers
Süper Lig players
TFF First League players
TFF Second League players
Association football forwards